is a Japanese television series starring Kai and Kana Kurashina. The series is based on a novel with the same name and is written by Kuniko Mukōda. It aired on WOWOW every Saturday at 10:00 (JST) starting from January 13, 2018.

Plot 
This tele about a Kishikawa Naoko, a 31 years old woman who works in an undergarment department shop. By coincidence, she meets Lee Ji-won, a South Korean photographer who changes her life after their meeting, and starts to uncover her family's secrets bit by bit.

Cast

Main 
 Kai as Lee Ji-won
A Korean photographer who has been in Japan for 2 years. He meets Naoko at the shooting site and they become attracted to each other.
 Kana Kurashina as Kishikawa Naoko
A 31 years old salesperson at a women's underwear department and eldest daughter of the Kishikawa family. She lives with her parent and younger sister.

Supporting

People around Kishikawa Naoko 
 Seika Furuhata as Kishikawa Junko (sister)
A high school student who works a part-time job and keeping it as a secret from her family. She wishes to get out of their old house and live alone.
 Atsuko Takahata as Kishikawa Sue (mother)
After her husband's retirement, she took a part-time job and from the exhaustion, she neglect doing the household chores.
 Shirō Sano as Kishikawa Shuji (father)
Three years ago, he retired from his company. Because of his pride, he doesn't seem to find a regular job for himself. He works a part-time job at a security company. He has secrets that he cannot tell to his family and is giving him a daily stress.

Others 
 Kentaro
 Shoko Takada

Production 
The drama marks the first time a non-Japaneses actor taking the lead role in a drama produced by the broadcasting station WOWOW.

Filming began in Japan in March then moved to Jeju, South Korea on April 15. Filming ended in May, 2017.

Original soundtrack

List of episodes 
The first episode was aired four times for free for the watchers.

References 

2018 Japanese television series debuts
2018 Japanese television series endings
Wowow original programming
Television shows based on Japanese novels